Maccabi Kiryat Ekron Football Club is an Israeli football club based in Kiryat Ekron. The club plays in Liga Gimel, the fifth tier of the Israeli football league system.

History
The original club was established in 1962 and spent most of its years in the lower tiers of the Israeli football league system, rising, at its best, to Liga Bet, during the 1980s. In the Cup, the best performance by the club was in 1964–65, reaching the fourth round and losing 0–10 to Bnei Yehuda. The original club folded at the end of the 2007–08 season.

Re-establishment
In 2014 the club was re-established and was named after former Kiryat Ekron deputy mayor, Asher Okavi. The club registered to the Central division of Liga Gimel and played its first match on 19 September 2014, beating Hapoel Gedera 3–2 in the Cup.

Honours
Liga Gimel
Central Division champions:
1981–82
1998–99

Notable former players
 Idan Shriki
 Moshe Peretz

External links
Maccabi Kiryat Ekron Asher Israel Football Association

References

Kiryat Ekron
Kiryat Ekron
Association football clubs established in 1962
Association football clubs disestablished in 2008
Association football clubs established in 2014
1962 establishments in Israel
2008 disestablishments in Israel
2014 establishments in Israel